The Faculty of Architecture of the University of Porto, or FAUP, is an architecture faculty located in Porto, Portugal, and one of the fourteen constituent faculties of the University of Porto.

History 
Although the Architecture course has its roots in the School of Fine Arts of the University of Porto, FAUP has been independent for over 20 years, and has given rise to the modernist movement known as the School of Porto, which has achieved nationwide and worldwide prominence.

Two alumni of the school, Álvaro Siza and Eduardo Souto de Moura, have been distinguished with the Pritzker Architecture Prize.

Premises 

When the growing numbers of Architecture students at the School of Fine Arts were becoming excessive for the proper teaching of the course, the University of Porto granted a new location in another parish of the city, Massarelos. Álvaro Siza was commissioned to design the premises for the newly independent faculty, which were completed in 1992.

Notable alumni
Álvaro Siza Vieira (Pritzker Architecture Prize)
Eduardo Souto de Moura (Pritzker Architecture Prize)
Fernando Távora

External links 

 
Student's association AEFAUP

University of Porto
Architecture schools
Álvaro Siza Vieira buildings
Modernist architecture in Portugal